Xingren is a county-level city of southwestern Guizhou province, China. It is under the administration of the Qianxinan Buyei and Miao Autonomous Prefecture.

Geography and climate
Due to its low latitude and elevation above , Xingren has a monsoon-influenced humid subtropical climate (Köppen Cwa), bordering on a subtropical highland climate (Köppen Cwb) with very warm, rainy summers and mild, damp winters. Rainfall is very common year-round, occurring on 190 days of the year, but over 75% of the annual total occurs from May to September. With monthly percent possible sunshine ranging from 25% in January to 42% in August, the county receives 1,532 hours of bright sunshine annually, with spring and summer sunnier than autumn and winter.

References

 
County-level divisions of Guizhou
Qianxinan Buyei and Miao Autonomous Prefecture